The National Cricket Stadium was a cricket ground located in Tangiers, Morocco. It was the only stadium in Morocco that had been used for senior cricket.

Stadium hosted its first International Tournament from 12 to 21 August 2002. Pakistan, South Africa and Sri Lanka competed in a 50-overs one day triangular series.

The ICC has granted international status to the Tangier Cricket Stadium in Morocco official approval that will allow it to become North Africa's first international cricket venue.

History

The stadium was constructed by Dubai-based construction tycoon Abdul Rahman Bukhatir as part of his plan to globalise cricket and spread it throughout the Arab world.

The ground was selected to hold the 2002 Morocco Cup, which was a tri-series One Day International competition involving Pakistan, South Africa and Sri Lanka.  Seven One Day Internationals were played during the competition, with Sri Lanka eventually winning it.

This was the first time One Day Internationals had been held by an Affiliate member nation of the International Cricket Council, though top-class cricket hasn't returned to the ground since.

In 2004, Morocco played two matches there against the touring Marylebone Cricket Club.

Facilities

 Practice area: 6 turf wickets and 2 concrete wickets
 Stadium capacity: 5000
 Bowling machines
 Large changing rooms for players
 The ground is available for hire upon request
 Fitness Centre
 SPA: massage, Jacuzzi, beauty-saloon, aroma- therapy, reflexology
 Sports Centre with multiple usage
 72 equipped suites
 56 bungalows
 Restaurant
 Club House

Decline 
The stadium has gradually fallen into decline, in doing so casting a shadow over the future of Moroccan Cricket.

Due to mismanagement and a lack of funds the stadium has not been maintained. The wicket that once existed is now a feeding ground for sheep, and there is a digger stuck in mud in the outfield. Cricket matches have not been played in the stadium since 2013.

List of Centuries

One Day Internationals

List of Five Wicket Hauls

One Day Internationals

References

External links
 National Cricket Stadium, Tangier at ESPNcricinfo
 National Cricket Stadium, Tangier at CricketArchive

Cricket grounds in Morocco
Buildings and structures in Tangier
Sport in Tangier
2002 establishments in Morocco
21st-century architecture in Morocco